The 2013–14 Towson Tigers men's basketball team represented Towson University during the 2013–14 NCAA Division I men's basketball season. The Tigers, led by third year head coach Pat Skerry, played their home games at the brand new SECU Arena and were members of the Colonial Athletic Association. They finished the season 25–11, 13–3 in CAA play to finish in second place. They advanced to the semifinals of the CAA tournament where they lost to William & Mary. They were invited to the CollegeInsider.com Tournament where they defeated USC Upstate and East Tennessee State to advance to the quarterfinals where they lost to Murray State.

Roster

* Jerome Hairston left the team on January 7, 2014 after being suspended.

Schedule

|-
!colspan=9 style="background:#000000; color:#FFD600;"| Exhibition

|-
!colspan=9 style="background:#000000; color:#FFD600;"| Regular season

|-
!colspan=9 style="background:#000000; color:#FFD600;"| CAA tournament

|-
!colspan=9 style="background:#000000; color:#FFD600;"| CIT

References

Towson Tigers men's basketball seasons
Towson
Towson